"Sozin's Comet" is the four-part series finale of the American animated Nickelodeon television series Avatar: The Last Airbender. It was directed by Ethan Spaulding, Giancarlo Volpe, and Joaquim Dos Santos, and written by Michael Dante DiMartino, Bryan Konietzko, and Aaron Ehasz. Although the finale is split into four episodes, it aired as a two-hour four-part film on July 19, 2008. The Saturday airing of "Sozin's Comet" acted as a climax to a week of ten new episodes that concluded Avatars third season. Before the week of July 14–19, no episodes had been shown in the US since November 30, 2007, though some episodes had been released on DVD prior to their airdate. This is also considered a 92-minute television movie.

The finale focuses on series protagonist Aang's non-violent personality and his reluctance to kill Fire Lord Ozai. The finale also follows the exploits of many of Aang's friends and allies, including Sokka, Toph and Suki's struggle to destroy a Fire Nation airship armada, Zuko and Katara's battle against Azula, and Iroh and the Order of the White Lotus' attempt to liberate the city of Ba Sing Se.

"Sozin's Comet" was acclaimed by critics and fans alike, and is widely regarded as one of the greatest series finales of all time. The initial showing averaged 5.6 million viewers, a 195% increase compared to the previous year in its time period. The premieres of episodes beginning with "The Western Air Temple" throughout the week received over 19 million viewers, of which 5.6 million were from Sozin's Comet. At the 2008 Annie Awards, the director of the third part of "Sozin's Comet" won an award for "Best Directing in an Animated Television Production".

Although "Sozin's Comet" is the series finale, Avatar: The Last Airbender has continued as an ongoing graphic novel series published by Dark Horse Comics since January 2012, which takes place after the events of the finale and before the sequel series The Legend of Korra.

Plot

Part 1: "The Phoenix King"
Aang proposes a beach party in lieu of training, explaining that he has decided to challenge Fire Lord Ozai only after Sozin's Comet and its enhancement of firebending have come and gone, due to his self-perceived inability to fight the Fire Lord on equal footing. When Zuko tells the group that Ozai plans to use the comet's power to burn down the Earth Kingdom, revealing that he learned of Ozai's plans during the war meeting on the day before the eclipse, Aang resolves to face him when the comet arrives. Sokka decides to have a simulation fight against a scarecrow, but Aang refuses to kill it due to his pacifistic nature and non-violent upbringing, and even berates his friends after they pointedly tell him that he has no choice but to kill Ozai.

That night, Aang sleepwalks to an offshore island that disappears in the morning. After the group fails to locate him, Zuko takes them to June, a tracker who might be able to locate Aang. Meanwhile, Fire Lord Ozai proclaims himself to be ruler of the world, under the title "Phoenix King", and declares Azula to be the new Fire Lord, setting off with an airship fleet to burn the world and rebuild it under his new order.

Part 2: "The Old Masters"
Zuko's tracker, June, is unable to locate Aang, so the group instead decide to seek out Iroh. Zuko and his uncle tearfully reconcile after Zuko's earlier betrayal in the previous season. It is revealed that he, along with other characters encountered in previous episodes, are part of an otherwise non-aligned secret society known as the "Order of the White Lotus", which plans to liberate the Earth Kingdom capital city from Fire Nation rule. Zuko and Katara decide to fight Azula in the Fire Nation capital while Sokka, Toph, and Suki prepare to destroy the airship fleet. Meanwhile, Aang awakens on a floating island. Frustrated with his inability to find a way to defeat Ozai without killing him, he asks four of his past lives for advice. Unsatisfied with their answers, he asks the island for help. The island, which is actually a giant "lion turtle", bestows upon Aang the power of energybending and leaves him on the shores of the Earth Kingdom while Ozai arrives with his airship fleet to destroy both the Earth Kingdom and Aang.

Part 3: "Into the Inferno"

The Comet appears in the sky, and Azula's coronation takes place. Azula banishes nearly all of her subjects, haunted by the betrayals of her former friends Mai and Ty Lee at the Boiling Rock. Her paranoia and loneliness begin to drive her insane, causing her to hallucinate an image of her mother. Before she is crowned, Zuko and Katara arrive. Zuko accepts Azula's challenge to a one-on-one duel because he realizes Azula is distracted and he does not want Katara injured. Just as Zuko is on the verge of defeating Azula, she shoots a bolt of lightning at an unprepared Katara. Zuko throws himself in front of her and intercepts the lightning, preventing Katara from getting hurt, but gravely injuring himself.

Meanwhile, Sokka, Toph, and Suki hijack a Fire Nation airship, and use it to destroy Ozai's airship fleet, crippling his forces before they can burn down the Earth Kingdom. In Ba Sing Se, the Order of the White Lotus, led by Iroh, lays siege to the Fire Nation forces within the city, with the intention of re-conquering it in the name of the Earth Kingdom. Aang reappears and begins to duel the Phoenix King. When Aang refuses to kill Ozai despite an opportunity, Ozai begins to gain an advantage in the fight. At the end of the episode, Aang is cornered and forced to hide in an earth ball while Ozai repeatedly attacks to try to force him out.

Part 4: "Avatar Aang"
Zuko collapses while Katara and Azula fight. Katara manages to freeze Azula in a block of ice before chaining her to a drainage grate. Katara then uses her waterbending to heal Zuko. Azula's mind snaps completely; she alternates between shrieking and sobbing as Zuko and Katara watch in pity. Meanwhile, the Order of the White Lotus successfully liberates Ba Sing Se in the name of the Earth King.

After a fierce battle, Ozai slams Aang into a rock, hitting the scar on his back from Azula's lightning in the previous season and inadvertently releasing his locked seventh chakra, allowing Aang to enter the Avatar State. With the combined power of his past lives, Aang quickly overwhelms Ozai but refuses to kill him. After subduing Ozai, Aang finally understands the lion-turtle's meaning and uses energybending to strip Ozai of his Firebending, essentially rendering him powerless while Sozin's Comet vanishes beyond the horizon. During his coronation, Zuko promises to aid the world in the postwar reconstruction. He then later confronts his imprisoned father asking for the location of his mother. A final scene depicts the main cast gathered in Iroh's new tea shop, while Aang and Katara finally begin a romantic relationship.

Production

Co-creators Michael Dante DiMartino and Bryan Konietzko wrote the majority of the finale; DiMartino wrote parts one, three, and four, and Konietzko assisted with parts three and four. Aaron Ehasz, co-executive producer and head writer of the show, wrote part two. Ethan Spaulding directed part one, Giancarlo Volpe directed part two, and Joaquim Dos Santos directed parts three and four. Dos Santos was nominated for an Annie Award for his directing of part three, "Into the Inferno". Although "Sozin's Comet" was originally written as a three-part story, the creators noticed that the length had grown beyond what they had predicted from the initial script. To avoid pacing issues, they split the final part in two, adding several scenes to fill the remaining time.

The cast of "Sozin's Comet" includes all of the key characters from season three. Protagonists Aang, Katara, Sokka, and Toph are voiced by Zach Tyler Eisen (in his final role before his retirement), Mae Whitman, Jack DeSena, and Jessie Flower respectively. Iroh is voiced by Greg Baldwin and Zuko is voiced by Dante Basco. Grey DeLisle and Mark Hamill voice the two antagonists, Azula and Fire Lord Ozai, respectively. The co-creators also lend their voices to two minor characters in the third part, "Into the Inferno".

The animated effects in the finale were directed by Jae-Myung Yoo. A particularly tricky part to animate was the climactic scene where protagonist Aang tries to overpower antagonist Ozai. Konietzko originally pitched the scene to DiMartino and Ehasz, but the three of them encountered difficulties communicating how the scene would look. They ended up drawing a fully colored storyboard to send to the animation studios. Additionally, the finale featured a significant amount of fire compared to previous episodes, and were all hand-drawn by Yoo's team. Dos Santos observed that the fire effects alone cost more than most shows spend on an entire season. Although Avatar is not considered anime because of its American origin, Tasha Robinson of the SciFi Channel observed that "Avatar blurs the line between anime and [US] domestic cartoons until it becomes irrelevant." An IGN reviewer commented that "Sozin's Comet" "had that classic anime-look that I've always loved to see when watching old anime movies. The story through the animation was perfectly done."

The finale's music was written and composed by "The Track Team", led by Jeremy Zuckerman. Unlike past episodes, a music track produced by a live orchestra was used, rather than one in MIDI format. According to Konietzko, one of the most challenging scenes to pair musically was the Agni Kai duel between Zuko and Azula. The scene's pairing of moody and melancholic music with intense action was inspired by Ghost in the Shell, and a decision was made to quiet the sound effects to let the music set the tone, inspired by Blade Runner.

Avatar: The Last Airbender borrows extensively from East Asian art to create its fictional universe. Four "bending" arts exist in the universe; they are based on different styles and variations of Chinese martial arts: Baguazhang for airbending, Hung Gar and Southern Praying Mantis for earthbending, Northern Shaolin for firebending, and T'ai chi for waterbending. The fight scenes were choreographed by Sifu Kisu, who performed and filed every fight sequence with Konietzko to serve as reference for the animators. Additionally, the finale borrowed heavily from the Taoist concept of balance and order. The Avatar, an incarnation of a divine being, is supposed to maintain the world's order.

Nickelodeon originally broadcast "Sozin's Comet" from 8:00 pm to 10:00 pm EST on July 19, 2008. Just ten days later, on July 29, the "Book 3: Fire – Volume 4" DVD was released, which contained the four episodes as well as episodes 56 and 57, audio commentary from the series' co-creators, cast, and crew, and a comic book.

Reception

"Sozin's Comet" received critical acclaim; Ed Liu of Toon Zone stated that it made Avatar "one of the finest animated television series ever made", Andrew Whalen of Newsweek called it a "rare accomplishment", and IGN proclaimed that this "film" deserved an Academy Award. Toon Zone praised the skill of the animation directors in designing the sweeping movements of the battle sequences, as well as the slower scenes, "including one moving reconciliation and the quiet coda that ties off many of the remaining loose ends of the series". IGN reviewer Tory Ireland Mell wrote that she would "put it in the top ten films of all time". She also praised the artistic skill of the designers, stating that the "whole dark tone was gorgeous to look at", especially the "art of the Lion Turtle". She thought that "Sozin's Comet" lacked plot holes, as well as unnecessary plot devices, stating that the "story moved and kept us moving right along with it from beginning to end". She gave the episode a ten out of ten "Masterful" rating. Susan Stewart, reviewing for The New York Times, praised the show's effort at philosophizing, noting that "this is complicated stuff, the reconciliation of religion and violence, and it's beautifully rendered: simple enough for Nickelodeon fans and subtle enough for their parents, with humor to puncture the pomposity inherent in the heroic genre."

Reviewers remarked on the difficulty in understanding the voice of a new character: the Lion Turtle. The Lion Turtle was designed by Bryan Konietzko and character designer Jae Woo Kim. Konietzko disliked how the Lion Turtle turned out; he felt that the art was not up to standards of the original design he had received.

The premiere of "Sozin's Comet" averaged 5.6 million viewers, 195% more viewers in its time period than Nickelodeon had received in the previous year. During the week of July 14, 2008, it ranked as the most-viewed program for the under-14 demographic. The premiere of episodes 52–61 throughout the week of "Sozin's Comet"'s release received a total of 19 million views, and Avatar earned four spots in Nielsen's list of Top 20 Cable Results for the week ending July 20, 2008. It also appeared on iTunes' top ten list of best-selling television episodes during that same week. "Sozin's Comet"'s popularity affected online media as well; "Rise of the Phoenix King", a Nick.com online game based on "Sozin's Comet", generated almost 815,000 game plays within three days. A video game loosely based on the third season, Avatar: The Last Airbender – Into the Inferno, was released on October 13, 2008.

The finale episodes were also recognized by the awards circuit. Joaquim Dos Santos won the "Best Directing in an Animated Television Production" caption in the 2008 Annie Awards for his direction in "Into the Inferno". Additionally, music editor and composer Jeremy Zuckerman and the sound editing team were nominated a Golden Reel award for "Best Sound Editing in a Television Animation" for their work in "Avatar Aang".

References

Avatar: The Last Airbender
American television series finales
2008 American television episodes
Fiction about comets
Films directed by Ethan Spaulding
Films directed by Joaquim Dos Santos